Hata may refer to:

Places
Hata, Nagano, a former town in Nagano Prefecture, Japan
Hata District, Kōchi, a district in Kōchi Prefecture, Japan
Hata, India, a town and municipal council in Uttar Pradesh, India
Hata (Assembly constituency), a constituency of the Uttar Pradesh Legislative Assembly
Hata, a former village that is now the site of Ahta Indian Reserve No. 3
Hata, Purvi Singhbhum, a village in Jharkhand, India

Other uses
Hata (surname), a Japanese surname
Hata clan, a former immigrant clan to Japan

See also
Hata Station (disambiguation), multiple railway stations in Japan
Hatamoto